Hope Castle is a historic building located in Castleblayney, County Monaghan, Ireland.The building still stands, although unoccupied. Over the years, Hope Castle has been inhabited for various uses, such as homes to many, military barracks, a hospital, convent, and was most recently used as a hotel before its demise in 2010.

History
The land on which Hope Castle was built was originally under the ownership of Sir Edward Blayney, to whom it was granted in 1607. Blayney was a Welsh soldier who was granted land at Ballynalurgan and Muckno, where he built a stone defensive castle, Blayney Castle. The town of Castleblayney has grown up round that original site. Blayney was created the first Baron Blayney in 1621 and the Blayneys would continue to occupy the estate until after the 1830s. In the time of the second baron in 1641 the castle was captured by rebels fighting under Hugh Mac Patrick Dubh MacMahon. The baron escaped but his wife and children were captured.

The 7th Baron Blayney sold off part of the land in 1723. It was not until the 1780s that the present building, named Blayney Castle, was constructed near the old Elizabethan castle for Lieutenant General The 11th Baron Blayney, a famous soldier who owned the land from 1784 to 1834.

In 1853, The Rt Hon. Cadwallader, 12th Baron Blayney, sold the entire Blayney Estate to the wealthy Henry Thomas Hope, who substantially renovated the building. The 12th Baron Blayney was the last Lord Blayney. It was only under the ownership of the Hope family, the Scottish-Dutch banking family that is famous for their ownership of the Hope Diamond, that the Castle got its new name of Hope Castle, one which it still holds today. Henrietta Adela Hope, daughter of Henry Thomas Hope, who married an English Duke, later inherited the estate. Her husband was The 6th Duke of Newcastle, who held the courtesy title of Earl of Lincoln at the time of their marriage (1861) and later succeeded his father as the 6th Duke of Newcastle-under-Lyne. From 1900 to 1904, Hope Castle served as a home for H.R.H. Field Marshal The 1st Duke of Connaught and Strathearn, Queen Victoria's son, and his family. The duke was the commander of the British Forces in Ireland at that time. The Hope family left the estate in 1916, leaving it to serve as a military barracks during the War of Independence between the years 1919 and 1921. It later became the site of Monaghan County Hospital for the short time between 1932 and 1937. Beginning in 1942, Hope Castle served as a Franciscan Order Convent until the early 1970s.  After its many years serving as a local convent, Hope Castle fell into private ownership until the Monaghan County Council later acquired it in the 1980s. The County Council leased the building to several people, including the most recent local businessman, Chris Haren who was leasing the property when it was extensively damaged in an arson attack in November 2010. Up until the fire, Hope Castle was being run as a successful hotel, containing bar lounges, a restaurant, and several guest rooms.

Timeline

Demise
In November 2010, the eighteenth century home was subject to an arson attack that left the hotel building with extensive interior damages. In a very short amount of time the fire spread through the bar and lounge areas, up the stairwells, and into the upstairs rooms. The building was uninhabited at the time of the fire; however, the contents of the hotel including a considerable amount of the fittings, furniture, and valuable antiques were left completely destroyed. At the time of the incident, it was clear to local Gardaí that entry was gained by trespassers to the ground floor of the building where the fire was started. It is believed that a local group of teenagers forced entry to the building and intentionally started the fire. Although Gardaí questioned juveniles in the town, no persons were ever found guilty of the crime.

Architecture
Lieutenant General The 11th Baron Blayney originally built the current Blayney Castle (also known as Castle Blayney and later renamed Hope Castle) in the 1780s. It was later redesigned and styled using Georgian architecture by Irish architect Robert Woodgate in the year 1799. It is a three-story, five bay house located near the site of an earlier plantation, which was restored during the Victorian Era. Some of the embellishments include cresting on the roof parapets and on the entrance to the building, which has a central curved bow. A glass projection porch and canopy of ornamental iron cast were also added to the structure. The gate lodges, stables, and bath houses are still present, which provide a strong sense of history to the land. When it was taken over by the local County Council, the building was renovated and the 19th century additions to the gardens and main front were demolished. Hope Castle is surrounded by grounds of green land next to a forest area accompanied by a large lake, known as the Black Island. The building, although not currently in use, consists of several bedrooms, a bar lounge and restaurant area.

References

Buildings and structures in County Monaghan
Houses in the Republic of Ireland
Castles in Ireland
Architecture in the Republic of Ireland
Castleblayney